N51 may refer to:

Roads 
 N51 road (Ireland)
 N51 road (Luxembourg)
 Santiago–Tuguegarao Road, in the Philippines
 Nebraska Highway 51, in the United States

Other uses 
 N51 (Long Island bus)
 Solberg–Hunterdon Airport, in Readington Township, New Jersey, United States